Sokol Cholupice is a Czech football club located in Prague-Cholupice, Czech Republic. It played in the Prague Championship, the fifth tier of the Czech football system, until being relegated at the end of the 2010–11 season.

References

External links
 
 Sokol Cholupice at the website of the Prague Football Association 

Football clubs in the Czech Republic
Sport in Prague
Association football clubs established in 1924
Sokol